In the mathematical field of graph theory, the Foster cage is a 5-regular undirected graph with 30 vertices and 75 edges. It is one of the four (5,5)-cage graphs, the others being the Meringer graph, the Robertson–Wegner graph, and the Wong graph.

Like the unrelated Foster graph, it is named after R. M. Foster.

It has chromatic number 4, diameter 3, and is 5-vertex-connected.

Algebraic properties
The characteristic polynomial of the Foster cage is

References 

Individual graphs
Regular graphs